Nikolai Rehnen (born 4 February 1997) is a German professional footballer who plays as a goalkeeper for 2. Bundesliga side SV Sandhausen.

References

External links
 
 

1997 births
Living people
Footballers from Cologne
German footballers
Germany youth international footballers
Association football goalkeepers
Arminia Bielefeld players
SC Fortuna Köln players
Alemannia Aachen players
SV Sandhausen players
2. Bundesliga players
3. Liga players